The 2006 Solihull Metropolitan Borough Council election took place on 4 May 2006 to elect members of Solihull Metropolitan Borough Council in the West Midlands, England. One third of the council was up for election and the Conservative Party stayed in overall control of the council.

Campaign
Before the election there had been two by-elections resulting in Conservative holds, and a Liberal Democrat defection in Shirley West, with Howard Allen changing to Independent. As such the Conservatives ran the council with 27 seats, compared to 14 for the Liberal Democrats, 8 for Labour and 2 independents. This meant the Liberal Democrats only needed to gain 2 seats to deprive the Conservatives of a majority, with predictions in the press that they could achieve this, after gaining the parliamentary seat at the 2005 general election.

The Liberal Democrats campaigned against cuts to Solihull's Music Service, opposed windfall developments and brought the president of the Liberal Democrats Simon Hughes to Solihull to open their local election campaign. The Conservative leader of the council Ted Richards predicted their record would enable them to stay in control and the party supported the expansion of Birmingham Airport and the bringing of a Super Casino to the region, both of which the Liberal Democrats opposed. Other issues in the election included proposals for the regeneration of Shirley and Chelmsley Wood, and a plan to transform northern Solihull. Apart from the 3 parties with seats on the council, there were also candidates from the British National Party, Green Party and 2 independents in Shirley, both of whom former incumbent Conservative councillors for the old Shirley seats.

All 3 of the main party group leaders from the Conservatives, Liberal Democrat and Labour parties signed a pledge to avoid damaging race relations during the campaign.

Election result
The results saw the Conservative keep control of the council, but with their majority reduced to just 1 seat. The Conservative majority was reduced after the Liberal Democrats gained Shirley South from the Conservatives, meaning the Conservatives had 26 seats compared to 15 for the Liberal Democrats. The British National Party won a first seat on the council after winning Chelmsley Wood ward from Labour by 19 votes after a recount. This reduced Labour to 7 seats, while the 2 independent councillors were not defending seats at the election. Overall turnout in the election was 38.4%.

The successful British National Party candidate George Morgan described his win as a victory for the ordinary working man and put his success down to disillusionment with politicians, immigration and local social issues such as rubbish. Meanwhile, the defeated Labour candidate blamed recent events involving the national Labour government for his defeat. Following the election the other councillors from the Conservative, Liberal Democrat and Labour parties said they would have nothing to do with the British National Party councillor.

This result had the following consequences for the total number of seats on the council after the elections :

Ward results

References

2006 English local elections
2006
2000s in the West Midlands (county)